Pocosol is a district of the San Carlos canton, in the Alajuela province of Costa Rica.

History 
Pocosol was created on 3 November 1983 by Acuerdo Ejecutivo 231. Segregated from Cutris.

Geography 
Pocosol has an area of  km² and an elevation of  metres.

It is located in the northern region of the country and its limits are, to the north Nicaragua, to the south Monterrey, to the west Los Chiles, to the east Cutris.

Its head, the town of Santa Rosa, is located 44.7 km (1 hour) NE of Ciudad Quesada and 144 km (2 hours 51 minutes) to the NW of San Jose the capital of the nation.

It presents a level ground in almost all its extension.

Demographics 

For the 2011 census, Pocosol had a population of  inhabitants.  It is the fourth most populated of the canton, behind of The district counts on 15 395 inhabitants, turning it into the fourth most populated of the canton, behind of de Quesada, Aguas Zarcas y Pital.

Transportation

Road transportation 
The district is covered by the following road routes:
 National Route 35
 National Route 227
 National Route 752
 National Route 761

Settlements 
Pocosol has 44 population centers:

Santa Rosa (head of the district)
Santa María
Las Brisas
Acapulco
Tres y Tres
Asentamiento Juanilama
La Esperanza
San Martín
San Bosco
Santa Lucía
San Diego
San Andrés
San Isidro (Zapatón)
Buenos Aires
Esterito
La Milagrosa
Asentamiento Los Ángeles
Asentamiento Las Nieves
Asentamiento Santa Rosa
Parajeles
San Gerardo
Santa Cecilia
El Edén
La Luisa
San Luis
El Plomo
Rancho Quemado
Paraíso
Pueblo Nuevo
Paso Real
San Rafael
La Ceiba
La Aldea
San Alejo
San Cristóbal
Cuatro Esquinas
Banderas
El Conchito
San Isidro
La Guaria
El Jocote
Llano Verde
La Azucena
El Concho
Pueblo Santo

Economy 

There are three main economic activities: 

 Cultivation of agricultural products like citrus, sugar cane, roots and tubers.
 Dual purpose cattle activity (meat and milk).
 Reforestation and industrialization of wood.

Services 
Pocosol has health and educational services. In addition to a lot of commerce such as pharmacies, shops, financial institutions, restaurants, among others.

References 

Districts of Alajuela Province
Populated places in Alajuela Province